HMAS Swan (U74/F74/A427), named for the Swan River, was a  sloop of the Royal Australian Navy (RAN) that served during World War II.

Design and construction

The Grimsby class consisted of thirteen sloops, four of which were built in Australia for the RAN. Propulsion machinery consisted of two Admiralty 3-drum boilers connected to Parsons geared turbines, which delivered  to the sloop's two propeller shafts. The ship's company in peacetime consisted of 135 officers and sailors; this increased to 160 during the war.

Swans initial armament consisted of three QF  Mark V anti-aircraft guns and a quadruple .50 in anti-aircraft machine gun mount for close-in defence. From 1942, this was increased to four QF 4 inch Mk XVI guns in 2 twin mounts, with a close-in armament of a Bofors 40 mm gun and six Oerlikon 20 mm cannon. The ship's depth charge load had increased to 40 by the end of the war.

Swan was laid down by Cockatoo Island Dockyard at Sydney, New South Wales on 1 May 1935. She was launched on 28 March 1936, and commissioned into the RAN on 21 January 1937.

Operational history

World War II
Swan served as an escort and patrol vessel during World War II and escorted many convoys, including the Pensacola Convoy,  in Australian waters and the South-West Pacific. On 12 January Swan arrived at Ambon escorting Bantam with reinforcements and remained there until 18 January, engaging bombers during raids on 15–16 January. In late January 1942 the ship was assigned to the short lived American-British-Dutch-Australian Command.

By eleven in the morning the convoy was being shadowed by a Japanese flying boat that dropped some bombs without causing damage before departing. The next morning another shadowing aircraft had taken position and before noon the convoy was attacked by bombers and flying boats in two waves. After the attacks the convoy continued toward Timor for a few hours with Houston launching a scout plane seeking the enemy position. ABDA suspected the presence of Japanese carriers, an imminent invasion of Timor and a support fleet lying in wait and thus ordered the convoy back to Darwin which it reached before noon on the 18th.

Swan was in Darwin the next day when the Japanese attacked the port and was secured alongside , which had a cargo that included 100 depth charges. The ship managed to get underway and contributed fire in defence, but was heavily damaged by a near miss. The day after the attack Warrego escorted the damaged Swan through Clarence Strait. Three crew members were killed in the attack.

On 2 September 1942 Swan with  departed Townsville escorting Sea Witch,  and   bound for Port Moresby and Milne Bay.   joined to be the escort with Swan for Anshun and  's Jacob to Milne Bay while Castlemaine escorted Sea Witch and Taroona to Port Moresby.

General Kenneth Eather, GOC Australian 11th Division, accepted the surrender of Japanese forces in New Ireland from General Ito on board Swan on 18 September 1945. From late 1945 to August 1948 she was used to command the RAN's minesweeping operation in Australian and New Guinean waters.

The ship received three battle honours for her wartime service: "Darwin 1942", "Pacific 1941–45", and "New Guinea 1943–44".

Post-war
Swan paid off to reserve on 18 August 1950, was converted to a training ship between October 1954 and February 1956 and recommissioned on 10 February 1956.

Decommissioning and fate
Swan paid off for disposal on 20 September 1962 and was sold for scrap to Hurley and Dewhurst of Sydney on 5 June 1964.

Citations

References

Further reading

External links

HMAS Swan (II) RAN Ship Histories

Grimsby-class sloops of the Royal Australian Navy
Training ships of the Royal Australian Navy
1936 ships